St. John's Cathedral is a Roman Catholic cathedral in Limerick, Ireland. Designed by the architect Philip Charles Hardwick, ground was broken in 1857 and the first Mass celebrated on 7 March 1859. It replaced a chapel founded in 1753.

History 
Between 1855 and 1861, the English architect Philip Charles Hardwick was commissioned to design the cathedral. At the time he was engaged in some work on Adare Manor. On 1 May 1856 the foundation stone was laid, and the building was consecrated in 1859 but remained unfinished until July 1861. The building of the original structure was undertaken by Patrick Kenna, Glentworh Street. Thomas Byrne undertook the later construction of the tower and spire from 1879. Construction of the tower was delayed by storm damage in September 1882. Following interior renovations, on 21 June 1894 the cathedral was consecrated by Cardinal Logue. A large portion of the original pews, memorials, confessionals, and floor tiles survive. The Bishop's throne or cathedra was produced in Munich in 1894, and has since been removed.

Architecture 
Hardwick was influenced by his time under Augustus Pugin, which can be seen in the Gothic Revivalist style of the cathedral. M.A. Hennessy adapted Hardwick's sketches for the tower, which was constructed between 1879 and 1883, with Hennessy adding 105 feet to the original design. The building is faced using local limestone. The tower was believed to be one of the tallest in Ireland when it was completed.

The overall architecture has been described as "severe" with minimal external decoration, and small windows. There is just one statue featured on the façade. In comparison, the tower and spire have more decorative adornments.

Between 1893 and 1894, the interior was renovated by Bishop Edward Thomas O'Dwyer which included a reordering of the sanctuary inspired by St Chad's Cathedral, Birmingham. This work was undertaken by Walter Doolin and Messrs Ryan, Limerick. The interior was again amended to take account changes relating to Vatican II.

The altar is constructed using Limerick marble and features a carving depicting the sacrifice of Abraham.

Restoration 
The most recent restoration work carried out was in 2003/2004 on the roof and exterior stonework. It is a Roman Catholic cathedral, the city's original cathedral, St. Mary's Cathedral, being Anglican. The building was claimed to have the tallest spire in Ireland at 94 m (308 ft), but a modern measurement showed it is only 81 m (266 ft), shorter than St. Colman's Cathedral, Cobh.

See also
List of tallest churches
List of tallest structures in Ireland

References

External links

St John's Cathedral from Limerick Diocese website
Website in memory of the Hardwicks
St. John's Cathedral History From Limerick's Life

John's Cathedral, Limerick
Roman Catholic cathedrals in the Republic of Ireland
Roman Catholic Diocese of Limerick
Religious buildings and structures in County Limerick
Buildings and structures in Limerick (city)
1861 establishments in Ireland
Roman Catholic churches completed in 1882
19th-century Roman Catholic church buildings in Ireland
19th-century churches in the Republic of Ireland